The Best There Is was released in 1987 and is a compilation of Dolly Parton's major hits that RCA Records issued after she left the label. The compilation included some of her early 1970s country hits, as well as some of her later 1970s and early 1980s pop hits.

Track listing
"9 to 5"
"Here You Come Again"
"Do I Ever Cross Your Mind"
"Think About Love"
"Coat of Many Colors"
"Jolene"
"I Will Always Love You"
"Appalachian Memories"
"But You Know I Love You"

References

1987 greatest hits albums
Dolly Parton compilation albums
RCA Records compilation albums